Crip Camp: A Disability Revolution is a 2020 American documentary film directed, written and co-produced by Nicole Newnham and James LeBrecht. Barack and Michelle Obama served as executive producers under their Higher Ground Productions banner.

Crip Camp had its world premiere at the Sundance Film Festival on January 23, 2020, where it won the Audience Award. It was released on March 25, 2020, by Netflix and received acclaim from critics. It was nominated for an Academy Award for Best Documentary Feature.

Premise 

Crip Camp starts in 1971 at Camp Jened, a summer camp in New York described as a "loose, free-spirited camp designed for teens with disabilities". Starring Larry Allison, Judith Heumann, James LeBrecht, Denise Sherer Jacobson, and Stephen Hofmann, the film focuses on those campers who turned themselves into activists for the disability rights movement and follows their fight for accessibility legislation.

Production 

The idea to make the film about Camp Jened started "with an off-hand comment at lunch." James LeBrecht had worked with Nicole Newnham for 15 years as a co-director. LeBrecht was born with spina bifida and uses a wheelchair to get around. However, he had never seen a documentary related to his "life's work as a disability rights advocate." At the end of the lunch meeting, LeBrecht told Newnham, "You know, I've always wanted to see this film made about my summer camp," and she replied, "Oh, that's nice, why?" Newnham told The Guardian, "then he completely blew my mind" explaining why he wanted to make this film. Newnham said:

Release
Crip Camp had its world premiere at the Sundance Film Festival on January 23, 2020. The film was released on March 25, 2020, by Netflix. The film was set to be released in a limited release that same day, but the theatrical release was cancelled due to the COVID-19 pandemic.

Reception

Critical response 
The website's critics consensus reads: "As entertaining as it is inspiring, Crip Camp uses one group's remarkable story to highlight hope for the future and the power of community." Metacritic, which uses a weighted average, assigned the film a score of 86 out of 100, based on 29 critics, indicating "universal acclaim".

Peter Travers of Rolling Stone wrote, "this indispensable documentary defines what it means to call a movie 'inspiring'." Justin Chang writing for Los Angeles Times said that "[the film] delivers an appreciably blunt message". Benjamin Lee of The Guardian wrote, "this impactful film shines a light on a forgotten fight for equality". Daniel Fienberg of The Hollywood Reporter wrote, "My only hope is that the confrontational title and the Obama branding don't scare some viewers away from a story that is truly non-partisan, humane and significant". Peter Debruge writing for Variety said, "[the film] proves to be the most educational for those born into a post-ADA world, a world of self-opening doors and accessible bathroom stalls and ramps that take wheelchairs into consideration".

Richard Lawson of Vanity Fair wrote, "The spirit of revolution—righteously angry yet full of bonhomie, demanding but generous in its reach—is alive and well in the film. As, one hopes, it is everywhere else". Carlos Ríos Espinosa of Human Rights Watch wrote, "The film made me realize the importance of building spaces for people with disabilities to organize". Katie Rife of The A.V. Club wrote, "[the film] will serve as an enlightening look at how much has changed in the past 50 years". Jake Coyle writing for The Washington Post wrote, "[the film] has a specific starting point but it unfolds as a broader chronicle of a decades-long fight for civil rights—one that has received less attention than other 20th century struggles for equity".

Awards and nominations

See also 

 2020 in film
 Crip (disability term)
 List of original films distributed by Netflix

References

External links 
 
 Official trailer
 
 , full official feature posted by Netflix
 

2020 films
2020 documentary films
Netflix original documentary films
Higher Ground Productions films
American documentary films
Documentary films about people with disability
Disability in the United States
Disability rights
Sundance Film Festival award winners
Films scored by Bear McCreary
Films set in the 1970s
Peabody Award-winning broadcasts
2020s English-language films
2020s American films
Films about disability